Poneloya is a town on the west coast of Nicaragua. It lies within the León Department and borders Las Peñitas, Nicaragua. The area was originally inhabited by indigenous groups who, according to genetic testing, were descended from the Sioux Tribes of the central plains. The town is a vacation home area for wealthy Nicaraguans, while local residents are mostly fishermen, caretakers, or those who commute to León for work.

Etymology 
The name Poneloya means “small seeds” in the indigenous language.

Climate, geography and ecology
Daily temperatures range from 32°C to over 40°C (89°F to over 104°F). During the night, the temperature is reduced to about 25°C to 30°C (77°F to 86°F). Due to its location near the sea, winds and breezes flow through the town, making the climate even cooler.

Several volcanoes exist near the town, including Cerro Negro, Telica, San Cristóbal, Las Pilas, and El Hoyo.

There is a large diversity of fish, crabs, and shrimp in the water, which are targeted by small scale fishing operations.

Transportation

The access road was re-engineered in 2009.

A regular bus service leaves every hour from the Sutiaba market in León.

Tourism

The beach is approximately 1.5 km long and is mostly dark sand with some coral.

Most of the visitors are from León and Managua; however, some international tourists will visit the town, as they traverse the country, heading either north or south. Vacationers from other countries visit the area mostly during the northern hemisphere winter/southern hemisphere summer. Peak travel dates are the Christmas period until the end of January, the school vacation holidays in Nicaragua, and the Easter week.

References

Populated places in Nicaragua
Populated coastal places in Nicaragua
León Department